"Beautiful" is a song by the alternative rock band Joydrop from their 1998 album, Metasexual. The single peaked at #20 on the Modern Rock Tracks chart.

References

1998 songs
Music videos directed by Paul Hunter (director)
Canadian alternative rock songs